Jasiel Rivero Fernández (born October 31, 1993) is a Cuban professional basketball player for Valencia of the Spanish Liga ACB and the EuroLeague.

Professional career

Argentina (2015–2019) 
Rivero made his professional debut on January 1, 2016, for Estudiantes Concordia. Rivero played with Boca Juniors for the 2018–19 season.

San Pablo Burgos (2019–2021)
On September 9, 2019, Rivero signed with San Pablo Burgos of the Liga ACB. Rivero would play a key part in San Pablo Burgos success in the Basketball Champions League as the club became champions both in the 2019-20 and 2020–21 campaigns.

Valencia Basket (2021–present)
On July 15, 2021, despite interest from clubs such as Panathinaikos, Rivero decided to sign with Valencia Basket of the Liga ACB. He reunited himself with his former head coach Joan Peñarroya.

National team career
Rivero represented Cuba during the 2015 FIBA Americas Championship. He averaged 18.8 points, 6.5 rebounds, and 0.5 assists.

References

External links
 Champions League Profile
 Eurobasket Profile
 EuroCup Profile
 RealGM Profile

Living people
1993 births
CB Miraflores players
Centers (basketball)
Cuban expatriate basketball people in Spain
Cuban men's basketball players
Power forwards (basketball)
Basketball players from Havana
Valencia Basket players